Puffa may refer to

 Puffa (character), a character from the children's television series "Tugs"
 Puffa jacket, a type of padded jacket